Donvetis Franklin (born January 15, 1978) is an Arena Football League defensive specialist for the Austin Wranglers.

High school years
While attending Douglas Byrd High School in Fayetteville, North Carolina, Franklin lettered in football.

Junior College Years
Franklin attended Hutchinson Community College in Hutchinson, Kansas for two years. As a sophomore, he was named a JUCO Honorable Mention All-American and finished his sophomore season with two interceptions and 68 tackles.

NCAA College Career
Franklin attended Michigan State University, where, as a senior, he helped lead his team to the Citrus Bowl and become one of the top ten teams in the nation.

External links
Austin Wranglers player bio
Stats

1978 births
Living people
Sportspeople from Fayetteville, North Carolina
American football defensive linemen
Hutchinson Blue Dragons football players
Michigan State Spartans football players
New York Dragons players
Columbus Destroyers players
Austin Wranglers players
Dallas Desperados players
Carolina Rhinos players